Silian station  is a station on Line 14 of Shenzhen Metro in Shenzhen, Guangdong, China, which is opened on 28 October 2022 It is located in Longgang District.

It will become a interchange station for Line 14 and Line 18 in the future. It reserved transfer passage for Line 18 at Line 14 platform.

History
In March 2018, Shenzhen Metro Group Co., Ltd. released the Environmental Impact Report of Shenzhen Urban Rail Transit Line 14 Project, which includes this station.

On April 22, 2022, Shenzhen Municipal Bureau of Planning and Natural Resources issued the Announcement on the Approval Scheme of Shenzhen Rail Transit Phase IV Station Name Plan, in which the station will continue to use the name, Silian station.

On October 28, 2022, the station was opened together with Shenzhen Metro Line 14.

Station layout

Exits
Silian station have five exits, of which Exit A and B are equipped with elevators.

Gallery

References

External links
 Shenzhen Metro Silian Station (Chinese)
 Shenzhen Metro Silian Station (English)

Railway stations in Guangdong
Shenzhen Metro stations
Longgang District, Shenzhen
Railway stations in China opened in 2022